Moldova participated at the 2010 Winter Olympics in Vancouver, British Columbia, Canada. Moldova's team consisted of seven athletes competing in four sports.

Alpine skiing

Moldova sent two alpine skiers. Christophe Roux and Urs Imboden are naturalized former Swiss skiers.

Biathlon

Men

Women

Levchenkova is a naturalized former Russian biathlete.

Cross-country skiing

Moldova sent one cross country skier of each sex.

Men

Women

Luge

Macovei is a naturalized Romanian athlete.

References

2010 in Moldovan sport
Nations at the 2010 Winter Olympics
2010